Vijaya Lakshmi Prakash, popularly known as Viji Prakash, is an Indian Bharata Natyam dancer, instructor, choreographer, and founder of the Shakti Dance Company and Shakti School of Bharata Natyam. Prakash has worked in the USA since 1976.

References

External links
 
 Sri. Rajarajeshwari Bhratanatya kala mandir
 Shakti Dance Company - Official website
 Website of Mythili prakash
 Asia Society, Texas, 'Mythili Prakash', ASTC Presents
 Embassy of the United states, Jakarta and Indonesia, PAU HANA International Workshop of Art Performance Jakarta | 12 February 2009
 The Huffington post, My Guru Viji Prakash : 27/03/2012

Living people
Indian female classical dancers
Performers of Indian classical dance
Bharatanatyam exponents
Indian dance teachers
Year of birth missing (living people)